"Le Petit Pain au chocolat" (Little chocolate bread) is a song by Joe Dassin. It was the second track of side 1 of his 1969 album Joe Dassin (Les Champs-Élysées).

It is a cover of the Italian song "Luglio", originally performed by Riccardo Del Turco. The lyrics were adapted into French by Pierre Delanoë.

Released as a single in 1968, the song "Le Petit Pain au chocolat" reached no. 2 in Wallonia (French Belgium).

Track listing 
7" single (CBS 3871)
 "Le Petit Pain au chocolat" (3:30)
 "Le Temps des œufs au plat" (2:43)

Charts

Other covers 
The song "Luglio" was also covered by The Tremeloes as "I'm Gonna Try" and by Herman's Hermits as Something's Happening.

References 

1968 songs
1968 singles
Joe Dassin songs
French songs
CBS Disques singles
Song recordings produced by Jacques Plait
Songs written by Pierre Delanoë
Songs written by Giancarlo Bigazzi
Songs written by Riccardo Del Turco